Casiano José Chavarria (born 3 August 1901 — date of death unknown) was a Bolivian footballer who played as a defender.

Club career 
His career in club football was spent in Calavera La Paz between 1925 and 1931.

International career
During his career he participated in the 1926 and 1927 South American Championship, and made two appearances for the Bolivia national team at the 1930 FIFA World Cup.

References

External links

1901 births
Year of death missing
Footballers from La Paz
Association football defenders
Bolivian footballers
Bolivia international footballers
1930 FIFA World Cup players